Bijela Rudina is a village in the municipality of Bileća, Republika Srpska, Bosnia and Herzegovina. It consists of three smaller villages: Krstače, Bijela Rudina and Milićevići.

References

Villages in Republika Srpska
Populated places in Bileća